Rivadavia is a city in the center-north of the province of Mendoza, Argentina. The city lies on the north bank of the Tunuyán River, downstream from the reservoir of the El Carrizal Dam, which is one of its tourist attractions.

Rivadavia is also known for attractions such as Rivadavia Canta al Pais, a large plaza downtown and many places for shopping.

External links

  Municipality of Rivadavia official website.
 

Populated places in Mendoza Province
Cities in Argentina
Argentina
Mendoza Province